Leonard Huntress Dyer (1873–1955) was an American inventor, patent attorney, and yachtsman from Washington, D.C.

The most remarkable of his inventions was a patented six-stroke engine using water injected as a 5th stroke for extra power and cooling, to be ejected on the final (sixth) exhaust stroke. Though this patent does not have an extensive past, it came up in 2008 with regards to the Crower six stroke engine.

Dyer was a member of somewhat high society, with a net worth of at least $500,000 in 1922. He owned the Yacht "Jack 'O Lantern," which was piloted to several victories by Abbot H. Brush.

Despite his high ties, there was trouble at home. In late 1922, a petition for divorce was filed by his wife, Josephine Dryer in Greenwich, Connecticut, citing intolerable cruelty, and infidelity with a young woman from Greenwich.

He was one of 4 brothers, George, Frank and Richard, all of whom had US Navy backgrounds.  In 1904 George Dyer was appointed by President Theodore Roosevelt as governor of Guam.

References

Sources
https://www.nytimes.com/1922/12/27/archives/wife-sides-leonard-h-dyer-would-divorce-wealthy-patent-lawyer-on.html
https://www.nytimes.com/1917/07/30/archives/dyers-yacht-first-home-jack-o-lantern-sailed-to-victory-in-indian.html
http://www.askart.com/askart/d/leonard_h_dyer/leonard_h_dyer.aspx
http://www.google.com/patents?id=GMRnAAAAEBAJ&dq=1339176

1873 births
1955 deaths
American patent attorneys
20th-century American inventors